Tigrayan-Tigrinya people or Tigray-Tigrinya people most often refers to two closely linked but different ethnographic groups of Ethiopia and Eritrea who traditionally speak the Tigrinya language:

 Tigrayans
 Tigrinya people